Woodson Independent School District is a public school district based in Woodson, Texas (USA).

Located in Throckmorton County, the district extends into small parts of Stephens and Young counties.

History
The district changed to a four day school week in fall 2019.

Academic achievement
In 2009, the school district was rated "academically acceptable" by the Texas Education Agency.

Special programs

Athletics
Woodson High School plays six-man football.

See also

List of school districts in Texas 
List of high schools in Texas

References

External links
 

School districts in Throckmorton County, Texas
School districts in Stephens County, Texas
School districts in Young County, Texas